The Fire Brigades Act 1938 (in force until 1941, repealed 1947) was the primary legislation for Great Britain, excluding London, that placed responsibility for the provision of a fire brigade onto the local authority, and away from the insurance companies.

The Act was passed following a report by the Departmental Committee on Fire Brigade Services 1935, which was also known as the Riverdale Committee in reference to its chairman, Lord Riverdale.

The Act was only in force for a short time before in 1941 all local authority fire services in Great Britain were transferred to the National Fire Service. After World War II new legislation was passed and the Fire Services Act 1947 took over as the primary legislation dealing with fire services in Great Britain.

See also
Fire service in the United Kingdom
Fire Services Act 1947
Fire Services Act 1951
Fire Services Act 1959
Fire and Rescue Services Act 2004
Fire (Scotland) Act 2005

References 

United Kingdom Acts of Parliament 1938
Repealed United Kingdom Acts of Parliament